The 1932 Cork Senior Hurling Championship was the 44th staging of the Cork Senior Hurling Championship since its establishment by the Cork County Board in 1887. The draw for the opening round fixtures took place at the Cork Convention on 31 January 1932. The championship began on 10 April 1932 and ended on 2 October 1932.

Blackrock were the defending champions, however, they were defeated by St. Finbarr's at the semi-final stage.

On 2 October 1932, St. Finbarr's won the championship following a 5-3 to 4-4 defeat of Carrigtwohill in the final. This was their 9th championship title overall and their first title in six championship seasons.

Team changes

To Championship

Promoted from the Cork Intermediate Hurling Championship
  Ballyhea

From Championship

Regraded to the Cork Intermediate Hurling Championship
 Midleton

Results

First round

Second round

Semi-finals

Final

Championship statistics

Miscellaneous

 Carrigtwohill qualify for the final for the first time since 1918.

References

Cork Senior Hurling Championship
Cork Senior Hurling Championship